Munduvareda Adhyaya is a 2021 Indian Kannada action film written and directed by debutant Balu Chandrashekar. The film is produced by Kanaja Enterprises. Deadly Aditya plays the lead role of cop and is supported by ensemble star cast Jai Jagadish, Mukhyamantri Chandru, Ashika Somashekar and others. Johny-Nithin composed the music, background score by Anoop Seelin and cinematography is handled by Dilip Chakravarthy. The film received a good review from India Today.

Plot 
Seasoned cop Bala investigates the murder of a prominent person as Contractor Vishwas Narayan. Initially case has no clues and all fingers are pointed towards a certain MLA Shanth Shankar. Bala plunges into the case and finally identities the murderer but then realises that it more complicated,  eventually will the super cop nab the real criminal?

Cast 
 Deadly Aditya as ACP Bala
 Mukhyamantri Chandru as Home Minister
 Jai Jagadish as Commissioner
 Bhaskar Shetty as Contractor Vishwas Narayan
 Ajay Raj as Actor Chinthan
 Vinay Krishnaswamy as MLA Shantha Shankar
 Ashika Somashekar as Journalist Sakshi
 Chandana Gowda as Doctor Acchari
 Sandeep Kumar as Karna
 Shobhan as Robert

Soundtrack 

The film's soundtracks are composed by Johny-Nitin and background score by Anoop Seelin. The music rights were acquired by Anand Audio.

References

External links
 

2020s Kannada-language films
2021 films
2021 action films
Indian action films
2021 directorial debut films